King Shaka International Airport , abbreviated KSIA, is the primary international airport serving Durban, South Africa. The airport opened its doors to passengers on 1 May 2010, 41 days before the start of the 2010 FIFA World Cup. It replaced Durban International Airport  and uses the same IATA airport code. The airport was designed by Osmond Lange Architects and Planners and cost  (about ).

Although the larger airport was built to grow the area's international services, it is also a key airport for domestic services throughout South Africa, serving the "Golden Triangle" between Cape Town International Airport, O. R. Tambo International Airport in Johannesburg, and KSIA itself with 7 passenger and 2 cargo airlines offering domestic air services.

The airport forms part of the Dube TradePort, which will additionally consist of a trade zone linked to the airport's cargo terminal, facilities to support the airport such as nearby offices and transit accommodation for tourists, an integrated agricultural export zone, and an IT platform.

The largest aircraft KSIA currently has scheduled services for is the Boeing 777-300ER, with Emirates operating Dubai–Durban, although KSIA's runway length and terminal are designed to handle the world's largest passenger aircraft, the Airbus A380 and smaller Boeing 747. In September 2015, during the World Routes Conference which was held in Durban (the first time on African soil), Turkish Airlines announced a new international service to Istanbul and Qatar Airways announced the commencement of service to Doha in December of that year.

On 27 January 2014, an Airbus A380-800 of British Airways landed at KSIA becoming the first A380 to do so. The aircraft was being used for training and operated many flights in and out of the airport until 4 February 2014. The aircraft also returned for further pilot training between 29 August and 1 September the same year.

History

Project conception and initial construction

King Shaka International Airport was first conceptualised in the 1970s, with construction beginning in 1973. By 1975, earthworks and a storm drainage system had been completed. However, the project was halted in 1982 due to the economic slowdown at the time.

The project was revived in the late 1990s when the limitations of Durban International Airport became apparent. The airport's  runway was too short to allow large aircraft such as the Boeing 747 to operate intercontinental routes out of Durban, and the resulting decrease in international air traffic caused Durban to become marginalised with respect to Johannesburg and Cape Town. Upgrading Durban International Airport was considered, but a study published in 2007 found that the existing airport would still have serious constraints and would reach its maximum potential by 2025, after which there would be no choice but to develop KSIA. It was also found that it would be 95% more expensive to operate Durban International Airport to its full potential and only then develop KSIA, than it would be to develop KSIA immediately. However, disputes between Airports Company South Africa (ACSA) and the Dube Tradeport firm (which is backed by the KwaZulu-Natal (KZN) provincial government) stalled the project until national transport minister Jeff Radebe intervened to jump-start the project in 2004.

The project was then hit by a tender war between the Illembe consortium (led by Group Five and Wilson Bayly Holmes-Ovcon) and the Indiza consortium (led by Grinaker-LTA). Both consortia pre-qualified for the tender in April 2006; however, the tender was awarded to the Illembe consortium, with the Indiza consortium not being considered for failing to meet certain tender requirements. The Indiza group appealed the decision, claiming that the correct tender process had not been followed and that their bid had been unfairly excluded; however, their legal challenge was dismissed by the Pietermaritzburg High Court in February 2007.

The final obstacle was a delay in the approval of the project's environmental impact assessment (EIA) by the South African Department of Environmental Affairs and Tourism. The EIA was eventually approved in August 2007; conditions attached being the appointment of an environmental control officer, issues of access from the nearby N2 freeway, and fauna and flora issues; in particular, the impact of construction and airport operations on a nearby colony of barn swallows.

Construction of the airport commenced on 24 August 2007, immediately after the approval of the EIA. Construction progressed steadily throughout the next two years, with operational testing of the airport beginning in December 2009. The airport handled its first commercial flights on 1 May 2010. In spite of the high construction costs, the airport was designed without a viewing deck and travellators.

It was unclear what the fate of the existing Durban International Airport would be now that the KSIA was complete. It was originally expected that the airport would be decommissioned and the site (in a prime industrial area) would be redeveloped, possibly as a dug-out port serving nearby automotive assembly and components factories; however, such plans have been put on hold. The Durban International Airport eventually became defunct.

British Airways used to fly between Durban and London. Imperial Airways, one of its predecessors, operated a multistop flying-boat service from 1937 to 1947; the aircraft required nearly one week's time to cover the route. British Airways itself flew from Durban's old airport to London in the 1980s and '90s. Boeing 747s performed these flights, which made a stopover in Harare or Johannesburg. The carrier returned to Durban in October 2018, this time inaugurating a direct link to the British capital. However, the Boeing 787 service came to an end in March 2021 amid the COVID-19 pandemic.

Naming process
Despite wide expectations that the airport would be named "King Shaka International Airport" (Shaka was the leader of the Zulu nation in the early 19th century), it emerged in October 2009 that the airport needed to undergo a formal naming process. The former premier of KZN, S'bu Ndebele, described the naming process as urgent, stating that "pilots cannot fly to a place with no name". Public hearings on the naming of the airport began at the beginning of November 2009, with most attendees favouring "King Shaka International Airport" as the new airport's name.

On 8 December 2009, it was reported that "King Shaka International Airport" was indeed the most popular name for the new airport. The airport name was approved by the South African Geographical Names Council on 14 January 2010, and became official on 2 February 2010 when the Minister of Arts and Culture gave final approval to the name.

Future
KSIA is currently building two new heavy class remote gates which will be named Foxtrot Aprons. Taxiway Bravo is also being extended and will connect to the runway north of Taxiway Hotel.

As of March 2010, information on future development at KSIA is scarce and conflicting. Long term master plans published on the Dube Trade port website show projected phases of development in the future; however, images of future development posted on an internet forum indicate five phases of development, with each phase to be developed based on annual passenger volumes reaching certain levels. Both sources of information agree that the airport would have two parallel runways with the passenger terminal building having an estimated capacity for 45 million passengers per year in the future.

Location
The airport precinct is bordered by the M43 road to the north, the Mdloti River to the south, the R102 road to the west, and the N2 freeway to the east.

Neighbouring communities are Cottonlands and the LIV village at Hazelmere Dam Wall to the west, oThongathi to the north-west, Verulam to the south-west, and eMdloti to the south-east. Notable communities further away are uMhlanga to the south and Ballito to the north. These communities are generally opposed to the airport because of noise concerns, recommendations for mitigation of which were made in the project's Environmental Impact Report.

Mount Moreland barn swallows
The roughly  reed bed where the birds roost is directly underneath the approach path to runway 06. When the construction of the airport was announced, there were fears that the reed bed would have to be destroyed due to the perceived threat of bird strikes, creating concern amongst environmentalists.

As a result, a study into the risks of bird strikes at KSIA was commissioned, with special attention being paid to the barn swallows at Mount Moreland. The study showed that the early morning dispersals of swallows generally happen before any scheduled arrivals or departures (earlier than 06:00), and the late afternoon swarms take place below the airport approach path, with only 5% of the birds protruding up into the path for a very short time (around 10 minutes). It was also noted that larger bird species, flying at higher altitudes, would pose more of a risk to aircraft than the swallows, such species already being a risk at Durban International Airport. The study concluded that it would definitely be possible for the airport and swallows to co-exist. Proposed risk mitigation measures included curtailing flight movements during the afternoon swarm, setting the glide slope approach to Runway 06 to 3.2 or 3.5 degrees rather than the standard 3 degrees (to stay above the birds), and the installation of a radar system that would monitor bird movements and be integrated into the operational plan of the airport.

In response to the study, ACSA contracted De-Tect Inc. to install a radar system that would monitor all bird activity around KSIA, notifying air traffic controllers of any dangers to aircraft. The radar system arrived in January 2009 and started collecting data to be used when the airport became operational.

Terminals

Passenger terminal

The passenger terminal is located at the southern end of the airport and is split into two levels: arrivals are handled on the lower floor, departures on the upper floor.

The check-in concourse, located on the upper floor, contains 72 check-in counters and 18 self-service kiosks, as well as ticket offices for the various airlines operating out of the airport. Passengers pass through separate domestic and international security checkpoints before proceeding to the departure lounges and boarding gates. The airport has 34 aircraft parking bays and 16 jet bridges. Four of the jet bridges (gates A20-A23) can be combined into groups of two to handle Code F aircraft (e.g. an Airbus A380) or can be used separately to handle four Code C aircraft (e.g. an Airbus A320 or Boeing 737). The remainder are capable of handling one Code C aircraft each.

The arrivals area is located on the lower floor, with a baggage reclaim hall containing 5 conveyors that can be allocated between domestic and international use. Most of the airport's retail shops are also located on the lower floor, as well as a piazza area immediately outside the terminal building.

The terminal does not have a public viewing deck, which has attracted public criticism. There are, however, vantage points on the elevated departures drop-off-road, as well as elsewhere in the airport precinct. The International Terminal is located to the left of the airport with two A380-800 docking bays in which four A330s can be parked.

Cargo terminal

The cargo terminal is located to the north of the passenger terminal, and is in the approximate centre of the airport precinct. In August 2009, Worldwide Flight Services was given a five-year contract to operate the cargo terminal.

In February 2013 Shree Property Holdings agreed to build a  facility in the Dube TradeZone and an additional  facility. Samsung is to build a TV Production Plant at The Dube Trade Port by the end of 2014; estimated cost over three years will be $20 million, thus increasing the production

from 500 000 flatscreens to 1 million.

One of the objectives of the cargo terminal is to recapture local air freight traffic from JNB. The airport also has the advantage of sea level operation as opposed to Johannesburg's high altitude, and is also near the Port of Durban, the busiest seaport in the Southern Hemisphere. The cargo terminal will initially have two Code F stands (capable of accommodating large aircraft, like the freighter variants of the Boeing 747-8), which can be expanded to ten stands in the long term.

Airlines and destinations

Passenger

 Two of these flights operate via Johannesburg. However, the carriers do not have rights to transport passengers solely between Durban and Johannesburg.

Cargo

Traffic and statistics
Prior to the COVID-19 pandemic, King Shaka International Airport handled 6.1 million passengers in the 2019–2020 financial year, with the majority (5.7 million) being domestic passengers, 393,309 being international, and a small percentage of traffic being classified as "unscheduled". 50,753 aircraft traffic movements were recorded; the majority again being domestic services. The impact of the COVID-19 pandemic on travel resulted in passenger numbers plummeting: only 1,5 million passengers were recorded during the 2020-2021 financial year; a decrease of 75.4%.  International travel was hardest hit, with a decrease in international passenger numbers of 94.4% being recorded.

The statistics place King Shaka International Airport as the third busiest airport in South Africa, behind both OR Tambo International Airport in Johannesburg and Cape Town International Airport.

The following tables list passenger and air traffic statistics for King Shaka International Airport as published by Airports Company South Africa. Statistics run between April and March the following year.

Notes:
 Statistics for 2010–2011 include operations at Durban International Airport up to and including 30 April 2010. Comparisons are made with the previous reporting period's statistics at Durban International Airport.

Ground transport

Road

The airport is accessible from both the N2 freeway and the alternative R102 road, with the M65 linking the N2 at exit 195 and the R102 between Verulam and oThongathi with the airport. The M65 does not continue from the N2 interchange to the coastal M4 highway, necessitating M4 traffic to divert to the N2 using either the M27 if approaching from the south, or the M43 (uShukela Drive) if approaching from the north; however, the airport's Environmental Impact Assessment recommended that the M65 should be extended to the M4 in the future should traffic volumes rise to the point where this would become necessary. Another notable road in the vicinity of the airport is the R614 from the Albert Falls and Wartburg areas, which terminates at the R102 in the northern outskirts of oThongathi; users of the R614 access the airport via the R102.

The majority of routes to and from the airport via the N2 involve payment of a toll: traffic leaving the airport to the south (the direction of Durban) must pass through the La Mercy Ramp Plaza located at the interchange of the N2 and M65, while traffic arriving at and leaving the airport from the north (the direction of Ballito/KwaDukuza) must pass through the mainline oThongathi Toll Plaza located at the interchange of the N2 and M43. Motorists arriving from the south along the N2 are not tolled, and the R102 acts as an untolled alternative route. The N2 S from the airport can lead to the M4 S in uMhlanga which leads directly into the city.

The airport contains 6,500 public parking bays, both in a short-term parkade and in a shaded medium-term parking area. Public road transport is provided by airport shuttle buses and metered taxis, which have been allocated their own pick-up and drop-off area adjacent to the terminal entrance to the international arrivals area.

Rail link
The main railway line heading north from Durban along the North Coast runs close to the R102. Direct rail access was provided for in the master plans, and is expected to be constructed after 2010 as part of the second phase of construction. In 2014, talks of a new high-speed monorail between the city and the airport were put forward, with an expected start to construction set for 2017.

Accidents and incidents
 On 13 August 2009, a privately owned Yakovlev Yak-18T (registration ZU-BHR) performed an emergency landing on the then unfinished runway due to a fuel contamination issue, becoming the first aircraft to land at KSIA.
 On 5 August 2012, a 1time Airline McDonnell Douglas MD-83 (registration ZS-OPZ) operating flight T6-653 from Durban to Cape Town International Airport suffered an engine failure to the right-hand engine on the initial climb out of Durban. The crew successfully returned to Durban on the remaining engine with no injuries being reported. Debris from the failed engine caused the runway to be closed for 3 hours resulting in numerous flight delays.
 On 29 August 2016, A Qatar Airways Boeing 787-8, registration A7-BDB performing flight QR-1367 from Doha to Durban via Johannesburg, was on approach to Durban's runway 06 when a bird impacted the nose of the aircraft. The aircraft continued for a safe landing on the runway. The aircraft remained on the ground for 31 hours.

Accolades

 2011 – 3rd Best Airport in Africa of the Airport Service Quality Awards by Airports Council International
 2012 – 2nd Best Airport in Africa of the Airport Service Quality Awards by Airports Council International
 2013 – 1st Best Airport in World Handling under 5 Million Passengers of the Skytrax World Airports Awards by Skytrax
 2014 – 1st Best Regional Airport in Africa of the Skytrax World Airports Awards by Skytrax
 2014 – 2nd Best Airport in World Handling under 5 Million Passengers of the Skytrax World Airports Awards by Skytrax
 2014 – 3rd Best Domestic Airport in World of the Skytrax World Airports Awards by Skytrax
 2015 – 1st Best Airport in World Handling under 5 Million Passengers of the Skytrax World Airports Awards by Skytrax
 2015 – 1st Best Regional Airport in Africa of the Skytrax World Airports Awards
 2015 – 3rd Best Domestic Airport in World of the Skytrax World Airports Awards
 2015 – 4th Best Regional Airport in World of the Skytrax World Airports Awards
 2015 – 2nd Best Airport in Africa of the Airport Service Quality Awards by Airports Council International
 2016 – 1st Best Regional Airport in Africa of the Skytrax World Airports Awards
 2016 – 1st Best Airport in World Handling under 5 Million Passengers of the Skytrax World Airports Awards
 2016 – 2nd Best Airport in Africa of the Airport Service Quality Awards by Airports Council International
 2017 – 1st Best Regional Airport in Africa of the Skytrax World Airports Awards
 2017 – 2nd Best Airport in World Handling between 5 & 10 Million Passengers of the Skytrax World Airports Awards
 2017 – 1st Best Airport Staff in Africa of the Skytrax World Airports Awards
 2018 – 1st Best Regional Airport in Africa of the Skytrax World Airports Awards
 2018 – 1st Best Airport in World Handling between 5 & 10 Million Passengers of the Skytrax World Airports Awards
2019 – 2nd Best Airport in Africa of the Skytrax World Airports Awards
2019 – 1st Best Airport in World Handling between 5 & 10 Million Passengers of the Skytrax World Airports Award
2019 – 1st Best Regional Airport in Africa of the Skytrax World Airports Awards
2019 – 1st Best Airport Staff in Africa of the Skytrax World Airports Awards

Passenger and terminal

References

External links

 King Shaka International Airport page on the ACSA website
 Dube Tradeport 

Airports in South Africa
Buildings and structures in Durban
Transport in Durban
Airports established in 2010
2010 establishments in South Africa
21st-century architecture in South Africa